Our School is a documentary film about the lives of ethnic Korean students in a Chongryon-run pro-North Korean high school in Hokkaido, Japan. Released on 29 March 2007 (Sunday), a Hankook Ilbo article on 3 April stated it had already exceeded 10,000 viewers. In the end, media reports claim it registered 85,000 or 90,000 viewer admissions in the South Korean domestic market, a far better performance than other recent documentaries such as the 2002 Yeongmae (영매, 20,000 viewers), the 2004 Repatriation (송환, 30,000 viewers) or the 2006 Bisang (비상, 40,000 viewers); it was suggested this might be a new domestic record. Director Kim Myeong-joon received the Kim Yong-gun Memorial Society prize in relation to his work on the film.

The film was released on DVD in Japan in 2009.

See also

 Hokkaido Korean Primary, Middle and High School

References

External links
Our School at HanCinema
Darcy Paquet's review at Koreanfilm.org
Cine 21 (Korean)

2007 films
2000s Korean-language films
South Korean documentary films
Documentary films about North Korea
Documentary films about high school
Films shot in Japan
2007 documentary films
Documentary films about Japan
Zainichi Korean culture
2000s South Korean films